This is a list of films which have placed number one at the weekend box office in Lithuania during 2023.

See also
 List of Lithuanian films — Lithuanian films by year

References

External links
 

2023
2023 in Lithuania
Lithuania